Matthew 5:7 is the seventh verse of the fifth chapter of the Gospel of Matthew in the New Testament. It is the fifth verse of the Sermon on the Mount, and also the fifth of what are known as the Beatitudes.

Content
In the King James Version of the Bible, the text reads:
Blessed are the merciful: 
for they shall obtain mercy.

The World English Bible translates the passage as:
Blessed are the merciful,
for they shall obtain mercy.

The Novum Testamentum Graece text is:
μακάριοι οἱ ἐλεήμονες,
ὅτι αὐτοὶ ἐλεηθήσονται.

For a collection of other versions see BibleHub: Matthew 5:7.

Analysis
Like Matthew 5:5 this verse has no parallel in Luke's Sermon on the Plain. New Testament scholar Robert H. Gundry therefore suggests that this fairly straightforward construction was probably thus a creation by the author of Matthew's Gospel. The theme is an obvious one for Matthew to choose: Eduard Schweizer notes that "mercy is the focal point of Matthew's message".

Other ancient literature can attest the grouping together of several beatitudes (cf. 4Q525 2; 2 Enoch 52:1–14) and the use of third person plural address (cf. Pss. Sol. 17:44; Tobit 13:14). The Greek word makarios cannot adequately be rendered as "blessed" nor "happy", as it is rather 'a term of congratulation and recommendation' which can also mean "satisfied" (as in ).

This verse, according to Gundry, marks the beginning of the second quartet of Beatitudes. The first four are all about private attitudes and conditions, the second four are about relations between people. Gundry feels the first four reflect the persecuted conditions of the disciples and the second four show the righteous behaviour that led to this persecution.

Commentary from the Church Fathers
Glossa Ordinaria:  Justice and mercy are so united, that the one ought to be mingled with the other; justice without mercy is cruelty; mercy without justice, profusion—hence He goes on to the one from the other.

Saint Remigius: The merciful (misericors) is he who has a sad heart; he counts others’ misery his own, and is sad at their grief as at his own.

Jerome: Mercy here is not said only of alms, but is in every sin of a brother, if we bear one another's burdens.

Augustine:  He pronounces those blessed who succour the wretched, because they are rewarded in being themselves delivered from all misery; as it follows, for they shall obtain mercy.

Hilary of Poitiers: So greatly is God pleased with our feelings of benevolence towards all men, that He will bestow His own mercy only on the merciful.

Chrysostom: The reward here seems at first to be only an equal return; but indeed it is much more; for human mercy and divine mercy are not to be put on an equality.

Glossa Ordinaria:  Justly is mercy dealt out to the merciful, that they should receive more than they had deserved; and as he who has more than enough receives more than he who has only enough, so the glory of mercy is greater than of the things hitherto mentioned.

References

Sources

05:07
Beatitudes